Carlo "Carl" Guevara (born September 9, 1988) is a Filipino actor and model. Guevara started his career when he and his brother Paolo joined the Be Bench / The Model Search where he won along with Regine Angeles.

In 2007, he made his first television assignment when he joined the cast of Star Magic Presents: Abt Ur Luv, Ur Lyf 2 as Julio. He has also done several episodes of Your Song including My Only Hope and Someone Like You in 2008. In 2009, ABS-CBN cast him into minor roles in Kambal sa Uma and Agimat: Mga Ang Alamat ni Ramon Revilla presents Tiagong Akyat.

In 2010, he is the 5th Star Circle Questor to sign an exclusive contract with GMA Network where he appeared in SOP Rules. Aside from the network change, he also change his name from Carlo to Carl. He starred in the lead role in Dear Friend: My Stalking Heart. He is also slated to appear in The Last Prince

Filmography

Television

Films

References

1988 births
Living people
Filipino male models
Filipino male television actors
People from Pasay
Male actors from Metro Manila
21st-century Filipino male actors
Reality modeling competition winners
Participants in Philippine reality television series
Reality show winners
Star Magic
ABS-CBN personalities
TV5 (Philippine TV network) personalities
GMA Network personalities